Nikolay Alekseevich Khomyakov (January 19, 1850 – June 28, 1925) was a Russian politician.

Life 
Khomyakov was born in Moscow, the son of Aleksey Khomyakov, a well-known Slavophile and poet. He was a graduate of Moscow University and served in the Ministry of Agriculture.

Khomyakov was active in zemstvo work. He was elected to the Second, Third, and Fourth State Dumas as an Octobrist.

Khomyakov was elected a member of State Council (1906–1907). He was Chairman of the Third Duma (1907–1910) and member of the Progressive Bloc in the Fourth Duma.

During the Russian civil war he was in the Red Cross and worked with Denikin's forces. Khomyakov emigrated to Yugoslavia and died in Dubrovnik.

He was awarded Order of Saint Sava.

See also 
 V.I. Gurko

Notes

References 
Features and figures of the past. Government and opinion in the reign of Nicholas II.

1850 births
1925 deaths
Politicians from Moscow
People from Moskovsky Uyezd
Octobrists
Chairmen of the State Duma (Russian Empire)
Members of the 2nd State Duma of the Russian Empire
Members of the 3rd State Duma of the Russian Empire
Members of the 4th State Duma of the Russian Empire
Members of the State Council (Russian Empire)
Moscow State University alumni
Recipients of the Order of St. Sava